Bailu may refer to:

Bailu (solar term) (白露), the 15th solar term of the traditional East Asian calendars

Places in China

Subdistricts
Bailu Subdistrict, Liuzhou (白露街道), in Liubei District, Liuzhou, Guangxi
Bailu Subdistrict, Yingtan (白露街道), in Yuehu District, Yingtan, Jiangxi

Towns
Bailu, Chongqing (白鹿), in Wuxi County, Chongqing
Bailu, Jiangsu (百禄), in Guannan County, Jiangsu
Bailu, Lushan (白鹿), in Lushan, Jiangxi
Bailu, Hejiang County (白鹿), in Hejiang County, Sichuan
Bailu, Pengzhou (白鹿), in Pengzhou, Sichuan
Bailu, Yunnan (白路), in Wuding County, Yunnan

Townships
Bailu Township, Gansu (白碌乡), in Dingxi, Gansu
Bailu Township, Chongren County (白路乡), in Chongren County, Jiangxi
Bailu Township, Ganzhou (白鹭乡), in Ganzhou, Jiangxi
Bailu Township, Jinggangshan (柏露乡), in Jinggangshan, Jiangxi

See also
Bailu Park (白鹿公园), a park in Chaoyang District, Beijing
Typhoon Bailu, Pacific typhoon name
Bai Lu (disambiguation)